Karacaören (literally "roe deer ruins" in Turkish) may refer to several places:

Dams in Turkey
 Karacaören-1 Dam
 Karacaören-2 Dam

Places in Turkey
 Karacaören, Aksaray, a village in the district of Aksaray, Aksaray Province
 Karacaören, Beypazarı, a village in the district of Beypazarı, Ankara Province
 Karacaören, Bor, a village in Bor district of Niğde Province
 Karacaören, Bucak
 Karacaören, Çanakkale
 Karacaören, Çorum
 Karacaören, Daday, a village
 Karacaören, Güdül, a village in the district of Güdül, Ankara Province
 Karacaören, Gümüşhacıköy, a village in the district of Gümüşhacıköy, Amasya Province
 Karacaören, Gölbaşı, a village in the district of Gölbaşı, Ankara Province
 Karacaören, Horasan
 Karacaören, Kahta, a village in the district of Kahta, Adıyaman Province
 Karacaören, Karacasu, a village in the district of Karacasu, Aydın Province
 Karacaören, Kozan, a village in the district of Kozan, Adana Province
 Karacaören, Koçarlı, a village in the district of Koçarlı, Aydın Province
 Karacaören, Kumluca, a village in the district of Kumluca, Antalya Province
 Karacaören, Kıbrıscık, a village in the district of Kıbrısçık, Bolu Province
 Karacaören, Kızılcahamam, a village in the district of Kızılcahamam, Ankara Province
 Karacaören, Mecitözü
 Karacaören, Sandıklı, a village in the district of Sandıklı, Afyonkarahisar Province
 Karacaören, Sinanpaşa, a village in the district of Sinanpaşa, Afyonkarahisar Province
 Karacaören, Sur
 Karacaören, Tercan
 Karacaören, Yenipazar, a village in the district of Yenipazar, Aydın Province
 Karacaören, Çay, a village in the district of Çay, Afyonkarahisar Province
 Karacaören, Şuhut, a village in the district of Şuhut, Afyonkarahisar Province

See also
 Karaca (disambiguation)